The ATS HS1 was a Formula One car used by ATS during the 1978 Formula One season. It was designed by John Gentry and Robin Herd.

Racing history
After running a Penske PC4 for 1977, ATS built their own car for 1978 with German Jochen Mass and Frenchman Jean-Pierre Jarier as their drivers. The opening race of the season was the Argentine Grand Prix with Mass 11th and Jarier 12th. In Brazil, The German had a fuel leak prior to the warm up lap and the team ordered Jarier to give his car up to Mass as he was team leader and the Frenchman didn't start and Mass finished seventh. The South African Grand Prix saw the Mass retire with engine failure and Jarier finish eighth. At the United States West, The German retired with brake failure and the Frenchmen finished 11th but the Monaco Grand Prix saw both drivers failed to qualify. Jarier left ATS after Monaco as he wanted to focus on Formula 2 and Can-Am to rebuild his career and was replaced by Italian Alberto Colombo for Belgium but he failed to qualify and Mass finished 11th, Spanish Grand Prix saw the Italian failed to qualify and the German finish ninth. Prior to Sweden, ATS split with Colombo and was replaced by Finland's Keke Rosberg as Theodore Racing whom he was driving for didn't show up, he finished 15th and Mass finished 13th. The French Grand Prix saw Mass finish 13th and Rosberg 16th, Mass was non classified in Britain as he was eleven laps down and Rosberg retired with suspension failure. The German Grand Prix saw Rosberg return to Theodore Racing and was replaced by Jarier but he failed to qualify and Mass retired from his home race after colliding with fellow German Hans-Joachim Stuck. Jarier quit the team and was replaced by Austrian Hans Binder for Austria but both cars failed to qualify, Binder was replaced by Dutchman Michael Bleekemolen for the Dutch Grand Prix but both cars failed to qualify. In Italy, Mass injured his knee during practice and was out for the rest of the season, he was replaced by Austrian Harald Ertl, who was eliminated in the pre-qualifying session in his Ensign but both cars failed to qualify. ATS entered one HS1 for the final two races of the season as they had built the ATS D1 for Rosberg to use for the rest of the season. Bleekemolen remained for the final two races, he retired from the United States with an Oil Leak and then failed to qualify for Canada.

Complete Formula One World Championship results
(key) (results in italics indicate fastest lap)

References

ATS Formula One cars